Playing with Dolls: Bloodlust is a 2016 American slasher film written and directed by Rene Perez. A sequel to the 2015 film Playing with Dolls. It stars Richard Tyson, Karin Brauns, Ian Dalziel, Elonda Seawood, Colin Bryant and Marilyn Robrahn.

The film was released on January 21, 2016.

Synopsis
A group of aspiring actors are chosen for a reality Horror TV show where they must survive a slasher movie. In time, the actors discover that the show is fake but they Slasher is real; who has been sent out to kill them.

Cast
 Richard Tyson as The Watcher / Scopophilio
 Karin Brauns as Stina (Karin Isabell Brauns)
 Elonda Seawood as Nico
 Colin Bryant as Magnus
 Marilyn Robrahn as Trudy
 Killer as AYO-886, Prisoner
 Andrew Espinoza Long as Rodrigo
 Leia Perez as Stina's Daughter
 Logan Serr as Magnuses Son
 Ian Dalziel as Mr. King
 Kerry Wallum as Commando 1
 Kaula Reed as Ex-Mrs. Magnus
 Omnia Bixler as Call Girl
 Emma Chase Robertson as Victim 1
 Joey Bertschi as Commando 2

Release
The film was released in Germany on January 21, 2016. The film was released to Blu-ray on April 6, 2018.

Reception
John Squires of Bloody Disgusting wrote: A Movie Titled Leatherface Was Just Released But Don't Be Fooled.

Sequel
A third movie titled Playing with Dolls: Havoc was released on July 18, 2017.

References

External links
 
 Playing with Dolls: Bloodlust at Blu-ray

2016 films
2010s slasher films
2016 horror films
Serial killer films
American horror films
American slasher films
2010s English-language films
2010s American films